Radio is the fourth studio album by the band Naked City, and their first to be composed entirely by bandleader John Zorn. The album was also released as part of Naked City: The Complete Studio Recordings on Tzadik Records in 2005.

Radio marked a return to the eclectic, "jump cut" style of the band's 1989 debut album, making drastic shifts from one musical style to another often every few seconds. The liner notes cite a wide range of musical influences including Charles Mingus, Little Feat, Ruins, Booker T. & the M.G.'s, Colin Wilson, Albert King, Chuck Brown, Orchestra Baobab, the Accüsed, the Meters, Tony Williams' Lifetime, Anton Webern, Sammy Cahn, Frank Sinatra, Morton Feldman, Igor Stravinsky, the Melvins, Beatmasters, Septic Death, Abe Schwartz, Ivo Papasov, Naftule Brandwein, Repulsion, Led Zeppelin,  Bernard Herrmann, Santana, Extreme Noise Terror, Conway Twitty, Siege, Ornette Coleman, Corrosion of Conformity, Massacre, Quincy Jones, Sam Fuller, Funkadelic, Carcass, Liberace, Jan Hammer, Eddie Blackwell, Charlie Haden, Mick Harris, Carole King, Red Garland, Boredoms, Jerry Reed, SPK and Roger Williams in addition to Zorn's previously identified touchstones.

Reception
In his 4 star review for the Allmusic website, Maurice Rickard states "Several genres and bands are skillfully evoked... and helpfully listed in the liner notes in order of occurrence. Jazz, surf, R&B, death metal, funk, acid rock, and serialism are grafted together in this collection, often into the same song, and the band shifts genres, tempos, and arrangements on a dime. Supposedly, Radio was conceived as a set for a college radio program, making it a kind of "Young Person's Guide to Naked City," beginning with accessible tunes, gradually building up listener tolerance to dissonance, and finally sandbagging the listener with evil blasts of dissonant metallic noise and convincing perpetrator-and-victim screaming."

Track listing
All music composed and arranged by John Zorn.

Personnel
John Zorn – alto saxophone
Bill Frisell – guitar
Wayne Horvitz – keyboards
Fred Frith – bass
Joey Baron – drums
Yamatsuka Eye – vocals

Credits

Published by Theatre of Musical Optics, BMI
Executive Producer: Disk Union
Associate Producer: Kazunori Sugiyama
Recorded April 1992 by Alec Head
Mixed September 1992 by Roger Moutenot
Assistant Engineer: Hoover Le
Mastered by Bob Ludwig
Digital Editing by Scott Hull
Cover photos: Man Ray
Design: Tomoyo T.L. (Karath=Razar)

References

1993 albums
Naked City (band) albums
Albums produced by John Zorn
Avant Records albums